Irish Cross is a sculpture by an unknown artist, installed in Salt Lake City, Utah, United States.

Description and history
The steel sculpture of a Celtic cross represents Ireland in Jordan Park's International Peace Gardens. It measures approximately 12 ft. x 5 ft. x 8 in., and rests on a concrete base which is approximately 10 in. tall and has a 24-inch diameter. The artwork was surveyed by the Smithsonian Institution's "Save Outdoor Sculpture!" program in 1994.

References

Celtic crosses
Outdoor sculptures in Salt Lake City
Steel sculptures in the United States
Irish-American culture